Julien Sauvage (born 2 August 1985) is a French professional swimmer, specialising in Open water swimming. He competed at the 2012 Summer Olympics.

References

French male long-distance swimmers
1985 births
Living people
Olympic swimmers of France
Swimmers at the 2012 Summer Olympics